The Baden Class I b  locomotives of the Grand Duchy of Baden State Railways were built for the pontoon bridges from Heidelberg to Speyer. Altogether three of these engines were on duty, of which two had been taken over from the Palatinate Railway in 1874. A third machine was procured directly from the Maschinenbau-Gesellschaft Karlsruhe in 1893.

All three locomotives were taken over by the Deutsche Reichsbahn as DRG Class 88.75. Shortly thereafter they were retired, however, as locomotives of the Bavarian Class D VI took over pontoon bridge operations.

This class should not be confused with the earlier class with the same designation which is usually referred to as the Baden I b (old) to distinguish it.

References

See also
Grand Duchy of Baden State Railway
List of Baden locomotives and railbuses

0-4-0T locomotives
01 b
Standard gauge locomotives of Germany
Railway locomotives introduced in 1874
B n2t locomotives
Maschinenbau-Gesellschaft Karlsruhe locomotives
Freight locomotives